Fremont University, formerly Fremont College, is a private college in Cerritos, California. The college offers professional degree programs with a focus on serving working adults.. Its intensive bachelor's degree program is part of a degree completion program that spans 15 months. The associate degree program also spans 15 months.

History 
The college has its origins in the founding of Platt College in 1879 in St. Joseph, Missouri, as one of the first business schools west of the Mississippi. The Southern California branch campus was established in 1986. Sabrina Kay, the college's chancellor and CEO, assumed leadership in 2007 and changed its name to Fremont College. Under her direction, Fremont College was founded with the principle of her doctorate dissertation framework of work-based learning leadership taught at The Wharton School. The teaching methodology referred to as Professional Action Learning (PAL) was also implemented under Kay's leadership.

Academics

Colleges and programs
Fremont University offers many degree programs, including: College of Business, Paralegal Studies Program, and College of Healthcare. Online degree programs are available for all programs.

GED exam preparation
Fremont University offers online GED preparation courses to prospective students who need to pass the GED exam before enrolling in a degree program.

Accreditation
The college is accredited by the Accrediting Commission of Career Schools and Colleges (ACCSC) to award Bachelor of Arts degrees (BA), Associate of Arts degrees (AA), Associate of Science degrees (AS) and Diplomas. In 2012, Fremont College was recognized as a School of Distinction by the ACCSC for delivering quality educational programs to students. Its paralegal studies program is approved by the American Bar Association Standing Committee on Paralegal Education. Fremont is one of 28 ABA-approved paralegal schools in California.

Teaching philosophy
The college's teaching methodology is based on research conducted by Kay during her studies at USC and the Wharton School at the University of Pennsylvania. The teaching methodology, referred to as Professional Action Learning (PAL) attempts to teach students using a variety of instructional techniques beyond standard textbooks and examinations. PAL is designed to make use of the operating concepts behind the Herrmann Brain Dominance Instrument and action learning methods to determine students’ learning strengths and to actively engage students in the learning process. The methodology involves guest speakers, videos, hands-on skills practice, group discussion, questions, dialogue and student presentations.

PAL involves a six-step process:

 Content delivery via lectures, textbooks, anecdotes, and current events.
 Questioning dialogue based on class content.
 Group discussion: students collaborate in small groups on topics and projects.
 Teachback, in which students take different roles and present group project results.
 Final reflective summary: students complete journals, exams, and papers.
 Students’ work becomes a part of the school's learning archive and becomes future content.

The college also follows the immersion education philosophy, where students focus on a single course at a time, in order to concentrate on the subject matter, before moving on to the next topic.

References

External links 

Distance education institutions based in the United States
Universities and colleges in Los Angeles County, California
Universities and colleges in Orange County, California
Educational institutions established in 1986
1986 establishments in California